The 1920–21 City Cup was the twenty-third edition of the City Cup, a cup competition in Irish football.

The tournament was won by Glenavon for the 1st time.

Group standings

References

1920–21 in Irish association football